Matej Stare (born 20 February 1978 in Kranj) is a former Slovenian racing cyclist.

Palmares

2001
1st Stage 4 Tour of Croatia
2004
1st Poreč Trophy
2006
1st Stage 2 The Paths of King Nikola
1st Stage 6 Tour of Morocco
2007
1st Stage 1 The Paths of King Nikola
1st Tour de Serbie
1st Stage 4
1st Stage 4b Okolo Slovenska
2nd Tour of Croatia
2008
1st Stage 12 Vuelta a Cuba
1st Belgrade–Banja Luka II
1st Raiffeisen Grand Prix
6th Tour of Qinghai Lake
2009
1st Stage 3 The Paths of King Nikola
3rd Gran Premio Industrie del Marmo
2010
3rd Poreč Trophy

References

1978 births
Living people
Slovenian male cyclists
Sportspeople from Kranj